A number of ships have been named Gardenia, after the plant.

, a former lighthouse tender in service 1917–19
, a Cypriot ferry in service 2002–12
, a Tanzanian oil tanker in service in 2012

Ship names